Maywood Assembly or Los Angeles No. 1, was a Ford Motor Company assembly plant located in City of Commerce, southwestern Los Angeles County, California.

History
The plant was in operation from 1948 until August 1957. During this time period Maywood/Los Angeles assembled both Mercury and Lincoln branded vehicles (Lincoln-Mercury Division of Ford Motor Company). Mercury was produced from 1948 to 1957, Lincoln from 1949 to 1956. In 1955 it was deemed that the Maywood plant's facilities were not sufficient for the increased amount of production being called on by the demand for new cars on the West Coast of the United States. A new location was selected in nearby Pico Rivera, California and designated as Los Angeles #2. It started operation at the start of August 1957 but, due to its unfinished paint booths, the Maywood plant remained in operation so that Edsel bodies could be sent over from Los Angeles #2 and painted, then trucked back where they were trimmed out and final assembly would take place. In late August 1957 all operations ceased at Los Angeles #1.

The plant's address was 5801 South Eastern Avenue, in Commerce near Maywood. It was across the street from the Chrysler Los Angeles Assembly plant. 

The factory was closed and demolished when operations at both the Maywood Assembly and Long Beach Assembly were combined in the new Los Angeles Assembly factory in Pico Rivera, California which opened in the summer of 1957.

Models assembled
Models produced at the Maywood Assembly include:
Lincoln Capri
Lincoln Cosmopolitan
Lincoln EL-series 
Mercury Eight
Mercury Montclair
Mercury Monterey

See also
 Ford Los Angeles Assembly Plant — located in Pico Rivera, eastern Los Angeles County.
 Ford Long Beach Assembly Plant
 Ford Motor Company Assembly Plant — located in Richmond, Bay Area, Northern California.

References

Fordmotorhistory.com: Ford Long Beach Assembly Plant
Ford Los Angeles Assembly Plant
List of Southern California automobile plants

Ford factories
Motor vehicle assembly plants in California
Manufacturing companies based in Greater Los Angeles
Maywood, California
Buildings and structures in Los Angeles County, California
1930 establishments in California
1957 disestablishments in California
Vehicle manufacturing companies established in 1930
Manufacturing companies disestablished in 1957
Defunct companies based in Greater Los Angeles